"Loopzilla" is a George Clinton song from his 1982 album Computer Games, reaching #19 on U.S. R&B charts. It uses lyrics from many older soul songs, including Four Tops' "I Can't Help Myself (Sugar Pie Honey Bunch)", as well as previous P-Funk hits. It is known for its repeated and warped lines.

The song is featured on the fictitious Grand Theft Auto: San Andreas radio station Bounce FM.

Chart performance

Notes

1982 songs
Capitol Records singles
George Clinton (funk musician) songs
Songs written by George Clinton (funk musician)